William James Large (28 March 1878 – 2 March 1964) was an English-born Australian politician. Born in Kent, he was educated at St Botolph's School in Northfield before migrating to Australia as a young man. He became a public servant with the New South Wales Department of Labour and an official of the Amalgamated Engineering Union, as well as an importer and company director. In 1940, he was elected to the Australian Senate as a Labor Senator for New South Wales. He held the seat until his defeat in 1951.

Large died in 1964 (aged 85).

References

External links

Australian Labor Party members of the Parliament of Australia
Members of the Australian Senate for New South Wales
Members of the Australian Senate
1878 births
1964 deaths
20th-century Australian politicians
British emigrants to Australia